Katrien Pauwels (born 8 November 1965) is a Belgian former competitive figure skater. She won medals at Skate America, Karl Schäfer Memorial, Golden Spin of Zagreb, and International St. Gervais. She placed 13th at the 1984 European Championships and 14th at the 1986 World Championships. Pauwels represented Belgium at the 1984 and 1988 Winter Olympics. She was Belgium's flag bearer in 1988.

Pauwels was born in Ghent, grew up in Mariakerke, and settled in Wondelgem. She works as a medical representative and also coaches figure skating in Eeklo. She has two daughters, Aurélie and Charlotte. 

Pauwels appeared on Dancing on Ice (Netherlands and Belgium) as a member of the jury.

Competitive highlights

References 

1965 births
Belgian female single skaters
Living people
Sportspeople from Ghent
Olympic figure skaters of Belgium
Figure skaters at the 1984 Winter Olympics
Figure skaters at the 1988 Winter Olympics